Greater Vernon is a conglomeration of municipalities centred on Vernon, British Columbia, which is a city in the Okanagan region of Canada. The metropolitan area includes Vernon itself, in addition to Coldstream, as well as Coldstream's neighborhood of Lavington. The Greater Vernon area is served by School District 22 Vernon, which provides school services for children in the area. Its population was 67,086 at the 2021 census, a 5.7 percent increase from its population during the 2016 census, which was 61,324. 44,519 of those that live in Greater Vernon are based in Vernon.

References 

Geographic regions of British Columbia
Metropolitan areas of British Columbia